Andrew Wharton (born 21 December 1961) is an English former professional footballer who played as a defender.

References

People from Bacup
English footballers
Association football defenders
Burnley F.C. players
Torquay United F.C. players
Chester City F.C. players
English Football League players
1961 births
Living people